Giovanni Paolo Recchi (mid-17th century) was an Italian painter and architect of the Barock period.

Born in Como. He worked in Turin and the Duchy of Savoy in fresco, with the assistance of his nephew Giovanni Antonio and his brother Giovanni Battista Recchi. Active in 1650.

References

16th-century Italian painters
Italian male painters
Painters from Piedmont
Italian Renaissance painters
Year of death unknown
Year of birth unknown